Gil Cueva Tabardillo is a Mexican politician representing the National Action Party (PAN). He served in the XIII Legislature of the Congress of Baja California Sur from 2011 to 2015.

Political career
Before getting involved in politics, Cueva Tabardillo worked in agriculture.

Cueva Tabardillo assumed his seat in March 2011 as a local deputy in the Baja California Sur state legislature representing the 9th district of his native Comondú Municipality. He served as secretary on the standing committees for Agricultural-Livestock, Forestry and Mining Affairs (Asuntos Agropecuarios, Forestales y Mineros), Ecology (Ecología), and Water (Agua). He also served as the inaugural president of the Political Coordination Board (Junta de Gobierno y Coordinación Política).

In August 2014 he asked federal authorities to stop the overfishing by a dozen sardine boats in the Magdalena Bay on behalf of local fishermen from the town of Puerto San Carlos who rely on the bay's supply to make a living. In December he requested and was granted a temporary release from his duties to pursue personal projects in lieu of the upcoming 2015 elections – one of 13 members of the legislature to do so. A few months later he was involved in the effort to organize the inaugural SCORE International Baja Sur 500 off-road race from Cabo San Lucas to Loreto, the first-ever SCORE race to both start and finish in the state.

Personal life
In January 2015, Cueva Tabardillo suffered a serious stroke and had to be taken to the state capital of La Paz for medical attention.

He is married to Blanca González Pelayo, daughter of furniture businessman Encarnación "Chon" González.

References

Living people
21st-century Mexican politicians
National Action Party (Mexico) politicians
Members of the Congress of Baja California Sur
Politicians from Baja California Sur
People from Comondú Municipality
Year of birth missing (living people)